Grant Hinkle is an American poker player who won the 2008 World Series of Poker (WSOP) $1,500 No-Limit Hold'em event.  He earned $831,462 at the event, bringing his total live tournament winnings to $1,640,843.

Hinkle won his WSOP bracelet at a final table that included 2000 WSOP Main Event winner Chris Ferguson.  The event began with 3929 players, at the time the largest ever field for a poker tournament other than the WSOP Main Event.

Hinkle hit  on the flop to give him a full house.

Less than two weeks later WSOP history was made when his brother, Blair Hinkle, also won a WSOP bracelet in the $2,000 No-Limit Hold'em event making them the first brothers to each win a bracelet during the same year.

On August 15, 2006, Hinkle won the third event in the inaugural Full Tilt Online Poker Series, a $216 buy in Limit Hold'em tournament. He bested a field of 726 to win the $34,848 1st prize.

World Series of Poker bracelets

Notes

Year of birth missing (living people)
American poker players
Living people
World Series of Poker bracelet winners